USS Jack has been the name of more than one United States Navy ship, and may refer to:

, a submarine in commission from 1943 to 1946 and from 1957 to 1958
, a submarine in commission from 1967 to 1990

References

United States Navy ship names